Jane Harrison (née Irwin; July 23, 1804 – May 11, 1845 or 1847) briefly acted as first lady of the United States, performing the duties of presidential hostess during the administration of her father-in-law William Henry Harrison, the ninth president of the United States. She was also an aunt-in-law and an aunt of the 23rd president of the United States, Benjamin Harrison.

Family life
 Born as Jane Irwin in Mercersburg, Pennsylvania on July 23, 1804, Jane Irwin Harrison was a granddaughter of James Ramsey, the owner of Millmont Farm in Montgomery Township, Franklin County, Pennsylvania.

Her parents, who had been married in 1798, were Archibald Irwin II (1772–1840) and Mary (Ramsey) Irwin (1781–1813). Following her mother's death in 1813, her father remarried, and Jane and her siblings were adopted by their father's second wife, Sidney (Grubb) Irwin (1789–1869). Her father and stepmother later died in 1840 and 1869, respectively.

Marriage and children
Jane Irwin married William Henry Harrison, Jr., a son of General William Henry Harrison. The couple had two children: James Findlay Harrison and William Henry Harrison III. In 1838, she was widowed when William Henry Harrison, Jr. died from complications related to alcoholism.

Relationship to a second American president
Her sister, Elizabeth Ramsey Irwin (1810–1850), married John Scott Harrison, another son of William Henry Harrison, in Cincinnati, Ohio in 1831. Benjamin Harrison, Elizabeth's son, later became the 23rd president of the United States.

Filling in for the First Lady
In 1840 William Henry Harrison was elected president. His wife Anna was too ill to travel when her husband left Ohio for his inauguration, but assisted by her aunt, Jane Irwin Findlay (her father's sister, who was then seventy-three), Jane Irwin Harrison acted as official hostess during President Harrison's brief tenure in office. Barely a month into his first term, he died from pneumonia on April 4, 1841.

Death
Jane Irwin Harrison died in her early 40s from tuberculosis in Cincinnati. While cemetery records indicate that her date of death was May 6, 1847, historians at the National First Ladies' Library have stated that her year of death was 1845.

References

External links
 Locket photograph misidentified as Jane Irwin Harrison as a widow, 1843  A close examination of the photograph clearly shows a woman who is significantly greater in age than 39.  It is most likely a photograph of her foster mother Jane Irwin Findlay.

Jane Harrison
1804 births
1840s deaths
19th-century American women
19th-century deaths from tuberculosis
First ladies of the United States
People from Mercersburg, Pennsylvania
Tuberculosis deaths in Ohio